Leonardo Guillén Medina (born 26 October 1976) is a Mexican politician from the National Action Party. From 2009 to 2012 he served as Deputy of the LXI Legislature of the Mexican Congress representing Sonora.

References

1976 births
Living people
Politicians from Sonora
People from San Luis Río Colorado
National Action Party (Mexico) politicians
21st-century Mexican politicians
Autonomous University of Baja California alumni
Panamerican University alumni
Deputies of the LXI Legislature of Mexico
Members of the Chamber of Deputies (Mexico) for Sonora